The Treaty of Punakha was an agreement signed on 8 January 1910, at Punakha Dzong between the recently consolidated Kingdom of Bhutan and British India. The Treaty of Punakha is not a stand-alone document, but represents a modification of the Treaty of Sinchula of 1865, the prior working agreement between Bhutan and British India. As such, the Treaty of Punakha is an amendment whose text incorporates all other aspects of the Treaty of Sinchula by reference.

Under the Treaty of Punakha, Britain guaranteed Bhutan's independence, granted Bhutanese Royal Government an increased stipend, and took control of Bhutanese foreign relations. Although this treaty began the practice of delegating Bhutanese foreign relations to another suzerain, the treaty also affirmed Bhutanese independence as one of the few Asian kingdoms never conquered by a regional or colonial power.

Background and enactment

For five months, between 1864 and 1865, Bhutan and British India engaged in the Duar War, which Bhutan lost. As a result, Bhutan lost part of its sovereign territory, accompanied by forced cession of formerly occupied territories. Under the terms of the Treaty of Sinchula, signed on 11 November 1865, Bhutan ceded territories in the Assam Duars and Bengal Duars, as well as the eighty-three square kilometer territory of Dewangiri in southeastern Bhutan, in return for an annual subsidy of 50,000 rupees.

By the turn of the century, continuing geopolitical developments raised the question of a new treaty. Ugyen Wangchuck had consolidated power as Penlop of Trongsa and was unanimously elected monarch by government and religious cadres just two years earlier, in December 1907.

The Treaty of Punakha was enacted on 8 January 1910, at the signing at Punakha by Sikkim Political Officer Charles Alfred Bell and the first Druk Gyalpo (King of Bhutan) Maharaja Ugyen Wangchuck.

Aftermath and abrogation
The Treaty of Punakha created a precedent for treaty modification and foreign suzerainty, and affirmed the practice of foreign subsidy to the Royal Government. The payments and lands subject to the Treaty of Punakha were accompanied by several contemporary and later agreements, some of which ultimately undid the Punakha amendments.

The Treaty of Punakha accompanied other contemporary agreements that had the effect of sharing profits from elephant hunting inequitably in Britain's favor; assigning land in Motithang (Thimphu Province) and a hill station between Chukha and Thimphu to the British; and assigning a portion of British Kalimpong to Bhutan, which later became Bhutan House owned by the Dorji family. The land around the Kalimpong estate had previously been ceded from Bhutan to British India at the conclusion the Bhutan War and as a condition of the Treaty of Sinchula in 1865. Kazi Ugyen Dorji of the Dorji family settled the land and took advantage of the lucrative trade routes through Kalimpong, and by 1898 assumed the roles of Trade Agent and mediator between the British Empire and Tibet.

On 8 August 1949, Bhutan's independence was recognised by India. On 23 April 1948, Sonam Topgay Dorji, also of the Dorji family, headed the Bhutanese delegation to recently independent India, meeting Prime Minister Jawaharlal Nehru. Topgay and Nehru established Bhutan–India relations, prompted by a growing security concern over Communist China. Bilateral negotiations lasted through 8 August 1949, culminating in the Indo-Bhutan Treaty. Under this agreement, India returned the land around Deothang, subject of part of the 1865 Anglo-Bhutanese War.

In February 2007, the Fifth King Jigme Khesar Namgyal Wangchuck signed a new treaty of friendship with India, replacing the treaty of 1949.

Text of the treaty
Below is the full text of the Treaty of Punakha.

See also
 Foreign relations of Bhutan
 History of Bhutan
 Treaty of Sinchula

Notes

References

Further reading
 Matteo Miele, Chinese Shadows on Bhutanese Independence after the Treaty of Punakha. The Tibetan Buddhist Connection and the British Diplomatic Action, in Seiji Kumagai (ed.), Buddhism, Culture and Society in Bhutan, Vajra Publications, Kathmandu, 2018, pp. 215-239

Treaties of Bhutan
Treaties of British India
Treaties concluded in 1910
Treaties entered into force in 1910
1910 in India
1910s in British India
Bhutan–India relations
Bhutan–United Kingdom relations